is a Japanese manga series written and illustrated by Kaiji Kawaguchi. It was published in Kodansha's Weekly Morning manga magazine from 1988 to 1996 and collected in 32 tankōbon volumes.

The series was adapted into an anime television special and original video animation (OVA) series by Sunrise. The special and the first OVA were later spliced together and released in North America into a single volume by Central Park Media.

In 1990, The Silent Service won the 14th Kodansha Manga Award for the general manga category. It has over 25 million copies in circulation, making it one of the best-selling manga series.

A live-action film adaptation will premiere in Japanese theaters in September 2023.

Plot
During the Cold War, the Japan Maritime Self-Defense Force jointly developed a nuclear submarine with the United States Navy. On its maiden voyage, the captain of the submarine, Shiro Kaieda, declares the submarine to be an independent state, "Yamato". Kaieda attempts to attend a UN summit in order to be recognized as an independent nation. However, many forces such as the United States Navy and the Soviet Navy try to stop Kaieda and his crew from reaching New York.

Characters

He was captain of the diesel submarine "Yamanami". Later, he was selected as captain of the first Japanese nuclear submarine, "Seabat". During a test with the U.S. Navy, he orders his crews to fire a torpedo against the U.S. Navy submarines and sneaks away from the area. Later, Kaieda declares that his submarine is an independent state and he names his state "Yamato".

CO of the Japanese Diesel submarine "Tsunami". Friend and rival of Kaieda. Kaieda and Fukamachi graduated from the National Defense Academy of Japan in the same year. Fukamachi was a captain candidate for the new nuclear submarine "Seabat". He tries to figure out what Kaieda is up to.

Executive Officer of the "Yamato". He worked with Kaieda for 10 years. The two trust each other's abilities.

Navigation Officer of the submarine 'Yamato'.

Sonar Specialist of the "Yamato".

Media

Manga
The Silent Service is written and illustrated by Kaiji Kawaguchi. It was serialized in Kodansha's seinen manga magazine Weekly Morning from 1988 to 1996. Kodansha compiled its individual chapters into thirty-two tankōbon volumes, published from December 15, 1989 to June 19, 1996.

Anime
The manga was first adapted as an anime special by Sunrise, first launched on December 18, 1995 and later broadcast on TBS on March 3, 1996. A two-episode original video animation (OVA) produced by Sunrise was released from September 25, 1997 to January 25, 1998.

In North America, Central Park Media's US Manga Corps dubbed the first two episodes, and released them on VHS on July 7, 1998. It was later released on DVD on January 9, 2001.

Video games
For PlayStation
Silent Service Released by Kodansha, September 28, 2000.

For Windows
Silent Service, released by SystemSoft Alpha, May 12, 2000.

Silent Service 2, released by SystemSoft Alpha, October 14, 2005.

Film
A live-action film adaptation was announced on January 25, 2023. The film is directed by Kohei Yoshino, with scripts written by Hikaru Takai, and Shinzō Matsuhashi and Takao Osawa serving as producers. Osawa will also play the lead role as Shiro Kaieda. The film will be released by Toho and will premiere in Japanese theaters on September 29, 2023, and will be streamed on Amazon Prime Video.

Reception
The Silent Service won the 14th Kodansha Manga Award in the General manga category in 1990. The first 29 volumes sold over 22 million copies. It has sold over 25 million copies.

Some international readers and viewers were uncomfortable with the storyline. There were many arguments among international critics that the series promoted the idea of militarism. The manga was discussed in the Japanese Diet and was popular with the Self-Defense Force.

Legacy
The Silent Service inspired the Korean movie Phantom: The Submarine released in 1999. Especially, the story behind how Republic of Korea Navy obtains Sierra-class submarine and the scene where they use communication buoy cable against the JMSDF submarine.

See also
 Last Resort (TV series)
 Zipang (manga)
 The Hunt for Red October

References

Further reading

External links 
 

1988 manga
1996 anime OVAs
Alternate history anime
Central Park Media
Kaiji Kawaguchi
Kodansha manga
Manga adapted into films
Military anime and manga
Political thriller anime and manga
Seinen manga
Submarines in fiction
Sunrise (company)
Winner of Kodansha Manga Award (General)